Arthur John Statuto  (July 17, 1925 – March 2, 2011) was an American football center who played for the Los Angeles Rams of the National Football League and the Buffalo Bills of the All-America Football Conference.

References

External links

1925 births
2011 deaths
American football offensive linemen
Buffalo Bills (AAFC) players
Los Angeles Rams players
Notre Dame Fighting Irish football players
People from Saugus, Massachusetts
Sportspeople from Essex County, Massachusetts